The September 26 Peony Garden incident refers to the large-scale investigation of the Peony Garden, a gathering place for gay men, by the Beijing police on September 26, 2010. A large number of homosexuals were taken away by the police for questioning. The Peony Garden is located in Haidian District, Beijing, and is a gathering place for gay men in the area. Because many homosexuals in Beijing dare not expose their identity, crimes including robbery occur frequently here, and there are also prostitution activities here. On the evening of September 26, the police dispatched more than ten police cars to the Peony Garden for the purpose of "combating prostitution". Special police and armed police were guarding the perimeter. As many as 200 homosexuals were taken away for questioning, most of them on the next day. Afterwards, some people reported that they suffered a certain degree of psychological trauma. Some civil AIDS organizations protested this incident. The Taipei Times believes that this incident reflects the fact that society does not yet have a tolerant attitude towards homosexuals, and that low-income homosexuals have nowhere to go.

References

History of Beijing
LGBT history in China
Chinese law